C16orf82 is a protein that, in humans, is encoded by the C16orf82 gene. C16orf82 encodes a 2285 nucleotide mRNA transcript which is translated into a 154 amino acid protein using a non-AUG (CUG) start codon. The gene has been shown to be largely expressed in the testis, tibial nerve, and the pituitary gland, although expression has been seen throughout a majority of tissue types. The function of C16orf82 is not fully understood by the scientific community.

Gene

Locus 
C16orf82 is located in humans at locus 16p12.1 on the positive strand.

General features 
The gene encodes for a 2285 nucleotide mRNA transcript that is intronless. Human intronless genes represent a unique subset of the genome that are often involved in signaling, sperm formation, immune responses, or development. C16orf82 being such a gene indicates it may play a role in one of these processes. Translation of C16orf82 initiates at a non-AUG (CUG) start codon. The presence of the non-canonical start codon suggests possible increased regulation of C16orf82 translation and/or possibly could allow for the translation of protein products that start with leucine instead of methionine as seen in proteins coded for by some genes present in the major histocompatibility complex.

DNA level regulation

Promoter 
The C16orf82 promoter region has been predicted to contain a number of transcription factor binding sites including binding sites for transcription factors within the SOX family. The presence of the SOX family transcription binding sites suggests that C16orf82 may play a role in sex determination. Actual transcription factor functional studies show binding of the C16ORF82 promoter by ARNT, ELF5, SMAD4, and STAT3.

Expression 
C16orf82 expression in humans has been observed in major organ systems including the heart, liver, brain, and kidney at a constant level.  The tissue in which C16orf82 has been seen to be most highly expressed has been the testis, both by microarray experiments as well as RNA-seq. C16orf82 expression is also highly variable between individuals, with some expressing the gene in large amounts while others barely express the gene within the same tissue type. Micro RNA (miR-483) over expression has been shown to knock down C16orf82 expression.

Protein

General features 
The C16orf82 protein is 154 amino acids in length with an approximate molecular weight of 16.46 kDa with a predicted isoelectric point of 6.06. There are no known variants or isoforms of C16orf82.

Domains 
C16orf82 contains one domain, DUF4694, which currently has a function that is uncharacterized. The domain spans from amino acid 8 to amino acid 153. DUF4694 contains a SSGY (serine-serine-glycine-tyrosine) sequence motif that is found in a majority of the protein's orthologs. There is no presence of a transmembrane domain thus the protein is not a transmembrane protein.

Cellular localization 

The localization of C16orf82 within a cell has been predicted to be nuclear. A bipartite nuclear localization signal can be found starting at Arg107.

Post-translational modifications 
The human C16orf82 protein has been predicted to be phosphorylated at a number of serine residues. O-linked glycosylation has also been predicted to happen at a number of sites, including some that overlap with the aforementioned phosphorylation sites.  The sites of  overlap between the two types of post-translational modifications could play important regulatory roles in the activity and lifespan of the human C16orf82 protein.

Secondary structure 
The secondary structure of the human C16orf82 protein has been predicted to be largely disordered by a number of modeling programs.

Evolution/homology

Paralogs 
No paralogs of C16orf82 exist within humans.

Orthologs 
C16orf82 has over 100 predicted orthologs, which all reside in the class mammalia and more precisely the subclass eutheria. All of the orthologs contained the domain DUF4964. The most distant ortholog detected was within the nine-banded armadillo (Dasypus novemcinctus) within the order Cingluata. Below is a table of 20 orthologs from various orders within the subclass eutheria with the sequence identity and time since divergence in relation to humans.

Rate of evolution 
C16orf82's rate of evolution was determined to be relatively fast even in comparison to fibrinogen, a gene that has been shown to evolve quickly.

Clinical significance

Behavioral disorders 
C16orf82 has been associated with Schizophrenia through a genome-wide association study and autism based on copy number variation analysis. Currently, research has not shown if C16orf82 plays any direct role in either of these disorders.

References